Bertie High School a public high school located in Windsor, North Carolina, United States.  It is one of three high schools in the Bertie County Schools system in Bertie County. Bertie High School's enrollment as of 2015 is 945 students.  The student body is 91% Black, 7% White, and  1% Hispanic.

Notable alumni
 Kent Bazemore, NBA player
 Travis Bond, former NFL and Canadian Football League offensive lineman
 Jessica Breland, WNBA player
 Billy McShepard (born 1987), American basketball player in the Israeli National League
 Jethro Pugh, NFL defensive tackle
 James Tootie Robbins, NFL offensive tackle

References

External links
 Home - Bertie High School

Public high schools in North Carolina
Schools in Bertie County, North Carolina